Lauritz Godtfred Rasmussen (11 June 1824 – 24 April 1893) was a Danish zinc and bronze caster. He established a zinc and bronze foundry in his own name in Copenhagen in 1865 and was appointed royal court caster in 1883. Many Danish monuments from the second half of the 19th century come from his foundry. It was later taken over by his son Carl Rasmussen and remained in the family for several generations.

Early life and education
Rasmussen was born on 11 June 1824 in Copenhagen, the son of shopkeeper Niels Rasmussen (1787–1854) and Ane Nielsdatter (1784–1863). In 1839 he became a brazier's apprentice under court brazier H. Dalhoff, a brother of J. B. Dalhoff. He completed his apprenticeship in 1844 and then the following year, together with a couple of friends, went abroad to practice his trade. He initially travelled to Berlin by way of Stettin and then continued to Warsaw. From there he continued alone to Meissen, Munich, Milan and Constantinople. In Munich he took part in the casting of Ludwig Michael Schwanthaler's monumental Bavaria statue. Rasmussen was awarded the title of royal court caster in 1883 and his foundry was listed as Purveyor to the Court of Denmark.

Career
After eight years as a journeyman in Europe, Rasmussen finally returned to Copenhagen in 1852 where he established a small business as a font caster in his father's basement.

After his father's death in 1854, Rasmussen established a zinc and bronze foundry at Åbenrå 22. Rasmussen's technical skill was soon noticed by Gustav Friedrich Hetsch. In 1859 the foundry relocated to larger premises at Sankt Annæ Gade 34 in Christianshavn and eight years later to Læssøesgade 14 in Nørrebro.

Other pursuits
From 1875 Rasmussen was a member of Industriforeningen's board of representatives. In 1883 he became the president of the board of representatives of Kreditforeningen af Haandværkere og Industridrivende. He also served as vice chairman of Foreningen til lærlinges uddannelse.

Personal life
Rasmussen married Auguste Emilie Rost (25 January 1829 – 15 May 1885) on 30 April 1855 in Meissen. She was the daughter of vineyard-owner and innkeeper Johann Karl Gottlob Rost (died 1833) and Christiane Friederike Götzin.

Legacy

Later history of the company
Rasmussen's foundry was taken over by his son Carl Rasmussen (1863–1936) and Herman Rasmussen. They moved the foundry to larger premises at Rådmandsgade 16 in 1897. Herman Rasmussen left the company in 1900. Carl Rasmussen's son Poul Lauritz Rasmussen (1897–1980) became a partner in the company in 1920 and its sole owner after his father's death in 1936. His son H. Lauritz Rasmussen (born 1921) became a partner in the company in 1945. The company closed in 1967.

Works
Bronze
 Statue of Frederik VII (Herman Wilhelm Bissen), Odense and Køge
 Tyge Brahe (Herman Wilhelm Bissen), Østervold Observatory, Copenhagen (1876)
 Statue of Peter Jansen Wessel Tordenskiold, Church of Holmen, Copenhagen (1878)
 Bust of Vice Admiral Suenson (Theobald Stein, Nyboder (1889)
 Statue of Carl Christian Hall (Vilhelm Bissen), Søndermarken, Copenhagen (1890)
 Seven of the statues for Frederick's Church

Zinc
 Jerichau's Lions, Lion Gate, Nordre Toldbod, Copenhagen
 Mercury and Neptume, Grønningen Gate, Nordre Toldbod, Copenhagen
 Blind children (P.S.Daniel), Royal Institute for the Blind (1858)
 Moderkærligheden (Theobald Stein), Frederiksberg Åndsvageanstalt (1860)
 Apollo med Melpomene og Thalia – sammen med Pegasus, Hippokrenes Kilde, (Ring), Royal Danish Theatre (1878)
 Minerva, der værger Børnene mod Pestgudens Pile (Vilhelm Bissen, Blegdamsvej Hospital)
 Fountain, Industriudstilling i Industriforeningen, later moved to Horsens (1872)

References

External links
 Source

19th-century Danish artisans
19th-century Danish businesspeople
Businesspeople from Copenhagen
Danish company founders
Danish metallurgists
Foundries in Denmark
1824 births
1893 deaths
Danish companies established in 1854